The Regional Parks Botanic Garden is a 10-acre (4 hectare) botanical garden located in Tilden Regional Park in the Berkeley Hills, east of Berkeley, California, in the United States. It showcases California native plants, and is open to the public in daylight hours every day of the year except New Year's Day, Thanksgiving, and Christmas. The Garden was founded on January 1, 1940.

Specimens

Notable specimens include nearly all the state's conifers and oaks, a very good collection of wild lilacs (Ceanothus species), perhaps the most complete collection of California manzanitas anywhere, expanding collections of Californian native bunchgrasses and aquatics, and representatives of some 300 rare and endangered vascular taxa of California. The Garden is organized into sections, each representing a distinctive natural area in California:

 Southern California
 Shasta-Klamath
 Valley-Foothill
 Santa Lucia
 Channel Islands
 Sierran
 Redwood
 Sea Bluff
 Pacific Rain Forest
 Franciscan

with subsections:

 Antioch Dunes
 Coastal Dunes
 Pond

Collected plants include: 

  silktassels
  manzanitas
  osoberry
  currants
  barberries
  Dutchman's pipe
  fuchsia-flowered gooseberry
  milkmaids
  western leatherwood
  scoliopus
  redbud
  California poppy
  trilliums
  shooting stars
  wallflowers
  fritillarias
  fawn lilies
  rock cress
  pussy willows
  California rose-bay or rhododendron
  woolly blue curls
  ninebark
  mountain spiraea
  summer holly
  ceanothus
  Chinese houses
  irises
  styrax
  blazing star
  monkeyflowers
  fremontias
  carpenteria
  tidy tips
  bush poppies
  brodiaeas
  mariposa tulips
  cacti
  clarkias
  mock orange
  western azalea
  matilija poppy
  fireweed
  ocean spray
  sweet shrub
  columbines
  penstemons
  scarlet mimulus
  buckwheats
  evening primroses
  gums
  larkspur
  lupines
  California fuchsias
  tarweeds
  hibiscus
  helianthus
  snowberries
  madrone
  cottonwoods
  deciduous oaks
  dogwoods
  hawthorn
  willows
  vine maple

See also 
 List of botanical gardens in the United States

References

External links 

https://nativeplants.org/ - Official website

Botanical gardens in California
Berkeley Hills
Tilden Regional Park
Parks in Contra Costa County, California
East Bay Regional Park District